The Long Đức Industrial Park is an industrial park located in Long Thành District, Đồng Nai Province, Vietnam.

It has a factory area of 200 ha within a 270 ha park. Access to major transport hubs:
42 km from Ho Chi Minh City
40 km from Cai Mep Thi Vai port
40 km from Cat Lai port
45 km from Tan Son Nhat International Airport
14 km from Long Thanh New International Airport (scheduled to open in 2020)

References

External links
:vi:Khu công nghiệp Việt Nam
Long Duc Industrial Park homepage

Industrial buildings in Vietnam
Buildings and structures in Đồng Nai province
Industrial parks